Mesoeucrocodylia is the clade that includes Eusuchia and crocodyliforms formerly placed in the paraphyletic group Mesosuchia. The group appeared during the Early Jurassic, and continues to the present day.

Diagnosis
 
It was long known that Mesosuchia was an evolutionary grade, a hypothesis confirmed by the phylogenetic analysis of Benton and Clark (1988) which demonstrated that Eusuchia (which includes all living crocodylian species) was nested within Mesosuchia. Due to the paraphyly of Mesosuchia, Mesoeucrocodylia was erected to replace Mesosuchia.

Several anatomical characteristics differentiate Mesoeucrocodylia from the other crocodylomorph clades. The frontal bones of the skull are fused together into a single compound element, for example. Mesoeucrocodylians possess something of a secondary palate, formed by the posterior extension of sutured palatine bones. The otic aperture of the members of this clade is blocked posteriorly by the squamosal bone.

Classification

Phylogeny

Below is a cladogram from Fiorelli and Calvo (2007).

References 

Jurassic crocodylomorphs
Cretaceous crocodylomorphs
Paleogene crocodylomorphs
Neogene crocodylomorphs
Sinemurian first appearances
Extant Early Jurassic first appearances